Admiral Radley is an American indie rock band based in California, formed in late 2009 by members from the bands Grandaddy (Jason Lytle and Aaron Burtch) and Earlimart (Aaron Espinoza and Ariana Murray). Admiral Radley released their debut album, I Heart California, on July 13, 2010 on their label The Ship. A decade later the EP ADRAD Radio was released on July 3, 2020.

History 

Originally, the band name was going to be Grandimart or Earlidaddy, a combination of both band's names. However, they decided to name the band after a man they met at a museum in Los Angeles.

Discography 

 I Heart California (2010)
 ADRAD Radio (2020)

References

External links 

 

Indie rock musical groups from California